Mecysmauchenioides is a genus of spiders in the Mecysmaucheniidae family. It was first described in 1984 by Forster & Platnick. , it contains 2 species from South America.

References

Mecysmaucheniidae
Araneomorphae genera
Spiders of South America